David M. Ainsworth (July 8, 1954 – May 31, 2019) was an American politician and a Republican member of the Vermont House of Representatives representing Windsor-Orange-1 District.

Born in Hanover, New Hampshire, he held a B.S. from University of Vermont (1977). Ainsworth was a fifth-generation dairy and vegetable farmer.

Ainsworth was former Royalton Town Moderator. He was elected to the Vermont House of Representatives in 2016, unseating incumbent Democrat Sarah E. Buxton by one vote. Two years later in 2018, Ainsworth was defeated for re-election by John O'Brien. Ainsworth previously served as the State Representative from 2007 to 2011.

References

External links
Official page at the Vermont Legislature

David M. Ainsworth at Ballotpedia

1954 births
2019 deaths
Farmers from Vermont
Republican Party members of the Vermont House of Representatives
Dairy farmers
University of Vermont alumni
People from Royalton, Vermont
21st-century American politicians